is a Japanese former Nippon Professional Baseball outfielder.

References 

1961 births
Living people
Baseball people from Okinawa Prefecture 
Japanese baseball players
Nippon Professional Baseball outfielders
Hankyu Braves players
Orix Braves players
Orix BlueWave players
Hanshin Tigers players
Japanese baseball coaches
Nippon Professional Baseball coaches